The Parsis (aka Parsees) cricket team was an Indian first-class cricket team which took part in the annual Bombay tournament. The team was founded by members of the Zoroastrian community in Bombay. It is affiliated to Mumbai Cricket Association. 

Many players of Parsis cricket team played for Mumbai cricket team, India national cricket team.

Bombay Quadrangular
The Parsis competed in the Bombay tournament from its outset in 1877, when they challenged the Europeans cricket team at the Bombay Gymkhana to a two-day match. At this time, the competition was known as the Presidency Match. It was recognised as a first-class tournament from 1892–93 until its final staging in 1945–46. The Parsis won the first-class tournament outright 10 times, and shared victory 11 times.

Tours of England
The Parsis made two tours of England in the 1880s, though none of the matches have been recognised as first-class. See: Parsi cricket team in England in 1886 and Parsi cricket team in England in 1888.

Notable players
Following is the list of notable players who played or playing for Parsi cricket team/Parsi Gymkhana :
 Polly Umrigar
 Farook Engineer
 Hoshang Dadachanji
 Suryakumar Yadav
 Siddharth Raut

References

Sources
 Vasant Raiji, India's Hambledon Men, Tyeby Press, 1986
 Mihir Bose, A History of Indian Cricket, Andre-Deutsch, 1990
 Ramachandra Guha, A Corner of a Foreign Field – An Indian History of a British Sport, Picador, 2001

1877 establishments in India
Cricket clubs established in 1877
Former senior cricket clubs of India
Indian first-class cricket teams
Parsi culture